Les Bergeronnes Aerodrome  is located  south of Les Bergeronnes, Quebec, Canada.

References

Registered aerodromes in Côte-Nord